Trucy-sur-Yonne (literally Trucy on Yonne) is a commune in the Yonne department in Bourgogne-Franche-Comté in north-central France.

See also
Communes of the Yonne department

References
ESPACE DANIEL PAILLARD

Communes of Yonne